Carlos Alberto Manaca Dias, known as Carlos Manaca or simply Manaca (born 22 September 1946) is a former Mozambican football player and manager. He also holds Portuguese citizenship.

He played 15 seasons and 326 games in the Primeira Liga for Sporting, Vitória de Guimarães, Estoril, Braga, Vitória de Setúbal and Sanjoanense.

Club career
He made his Primeira Liga debut for Sporting on 18 December 1966 in a game against CUF Barreiro.

Honours

Sporting
Primeira Liga champion: 1969–70, 1973–74.
Taça de Portugal winner: 1970–71, 1972–1973, 1973–74, 1977–78.

References

External links
NASL/MISL stats

1946 births
People from Beira, Mozambique
Mozambican emigrants to Portugal
Living people
Mozambican footballers
Sporting CP footballers
Primeira Liga players
A.D. Sanjoanense players
North American Soccer League (1968–1984) players
Boston Minutemen players
Mozambican expatriate footballers
Expatriate soccer players in the United States
Vitória F.C. players
S.C. Braga players
Vitória S.C. players
G.D. Estoril Praia players
Mozambican football managers
Mozambique national football team managers
1986 African Cup of Nations managers
Association football defenders